Hathairat Jarat (born February 9, 1996, in Khon Kaen) is a Thai indoor volleyball player. She is a current member of the Thailand women's national volleyball team.

Career
She played volleyball with the Nongruawittaya School from 2013–2015. She won the 2017 Asian U23 Championship Best Middle Blocker award.

Clubs 
  Thai-Denmark Nongrua (2015–2017)
  Khonkaen Star (2017–2020)
  PFU BlueCats (2020–2021)
  Nakhon Ratchasima (2020–2021)
  Khonkaen Star (2021–2022)

Awards

Individuals 
 2017 Asian U23 Championship "Best Middle Blocker"

Club
 2019 Thai–Denmark Super League -  Third, with Khonkaen Star
 2020 Thailand League –  Runner-up, with Khonkaen Star

References

External links
 FIVB Biography

1996 births
Living people
Hathairat Jarat
Hathairat Jarat
PFU BlueCats players
Thai expatriate sportspeople in Japan
Expatriate volleyball players in Japan
Hathairat Jarat